All India Federation of Democratic Women is a women's organisation in India, being the women's wing of the Marxist Communist Party of India (United). P. Krishnammal, a Kerala State Committee member of MCPI(U), is the general secretary of AIFDW. Previously it was the women wing of the main predecessor of MCPI(U), the Marxist Communist Party of India.

See also
Krantikari Adivasi Mahila Sangathan
Mahila Atma Raksha Samiti
National Federation of Indian Women

References

Marxist Communist Party of India (United)
Women's wings of political parties in India